The Regional Four Day Competition, formerly known as Shell Shield and Carib Beer Cup, is the first-class cricket competition in the West Indies. It is administered by the Cricket West Indies. In the 2013-2014 season the winner of the tournament was awarded the WICB President's Trophy while the winners of the knockout competition were awarded the  George Headley/Everton Weekes trophy. In a few previous seasons the winners of the tournament were awarded the Headley/Weekes trophy. From the 2017–18, the Competition had been sponsored by Digicel and was known as the Digicel Four Day Championship. Since 2019-20, the competition has been known as the West Indies Championship.

The competition is contested between seven Caribbean teams and, on occasion, touring sides from other countries. Four of the Caribbean teams, Barbados, Guyana, Jamaica and Trinidad and Tobago, come from individual countries while two teams, the Leeward Islands and the Windward Islands, which previously competed together as the Combined Islands, are each from multiple countries and territories. Beginning with the 2007–08 season the Combined Campuses and Colleges cricket team (CCC cricket team) were included in the competition, but in July 2014 the WICB announced that the CCC cricket team was to be excluded from the upcoming 2014-15 Regional Four Day competition as part of a series of changes adopted based on the recommendations made in a report presented by Richard Pybus, WICB's director of cricket, in March 2014.

The current structure of the tournament is a double round-robin league system with the team earning the most points being declared the winner. Prior to the 2014-15 season the tournament consisted of only a single round-robin league followed by semi-finals and a final.  In the past there was no knock-out stage and it was possible for the winners to share the trophy. The current champions are Guyana. Barbados have won the most titles, with twenty (and one shared), while Jamaica have won the most consecutive titles (five).

Competing teams 

The following teams have competed in every tournament since the 2007–08 season:
 Barbados (now going by the franchise name Barbados Pride)
 Guyana (now going by the franchise name Guyana Jaguars)
 Jamaica (called the Jamaica Franchise until the franchise name Jamaica Scorpions was chosen)
 Leeward Islands (now going by the franchise name Leeward Islands Hurricanes)
 Trinidad and Tobago (now going by the franchise name Trinidad and Tobago Red Force)
 Windward Islands (now going by the franchise name Windward Islands Volcanoes)

The following teams have also made appearances in the competition:
 Combined Islands – 1965–66 to 1980–81
 England Lions – 2000–01 (as England A), 2010–11
 West Indies B – 2000–01, 2001–02, 2002–03, 2003–04
 Bangladesh A – 2001–02
 India A – 2002–03
 Kenya – 2003–04
 Combined Campuses and Colleges - 2007-08 to 2013-14

Origins 
First-class cricket has been played in the West Indies since 1865, when Barbados beat Demerara (in what is now Guyana) at Bridgetown. Matches were played intermittently in the 1860s, 1870s and 1880s, with Demerara being the centre – Jamaica did not play first class games until 1895, while the first Barbados v Trinidad match took place in 1891. Because of the distances involved and travelling costs, there were only three teams in the Inter-Colonial Tournament, which began in 1891 and had 28 installments until it was finally discontinued in 1939. All three teams, Barbados, British Guiana (now Guyana) and Trinidad won more than five times. Jamaica had first-class status, but played few games (22 in their first 30 years), though they usually played touring teams from England, and when the West Indies got Test status in 1928 that increased the number of games played by Jamaica as well.

In the World War II years, there was no official Inter-Colonial tournament, but matches were still played between the three teams who had competed for it, and this continued after the war – but now with Jamaica joining in, too. In 1956, British Guiana hosted a four-team knock-out tournament, and this was repeated five years later but now with the Combined Islands joining in. The final unofficial tournament (which does not appear on records in Wisden Cricketers' Almanack or Cricinfo) was held in 1964, with Barbados, British Guiana, Jamaica and Trinidad competing in a league, which British Guiana won.

History of the competition 
The regular competition began in the 1965–66 season, named the Shell Shield (after sponsors Royal Dutch Shell), and the five teams that had contested the 1961 knock-out competed in a round-robin league, with two home matches and two away matches for each team. This format and name remained until 1981–82, when the Combined Islands were split by the West Indies Cricket Board, but that only meant that the season was lengthened to five games a team. Barbados won most of the early tournaments, with nine titles of a possible 14 from 1965–66 to 1979–80, before the Combined Islands won their first title in 1980–81 after four runners-up spots in the preceding six seasons – becoming the last of the five teams to win a title.

Barbados won three more titles before the tournament was restricted in the 1986–87 season – instead of a round-robin league, there were now two round-robin groups, determined by geography. The league was back for the next season, however, renamed to Red Stripe Cup (from the beer brand Red Stripe). Leeward Islands won their first title in 1989–90, winning all five games in the league, but Barbados were back on top for the following season. No team managed to win for two seasons in a row for the next fourteen seasons, though the Leeward Islands and Barbados exchanged the trophy for six seasons between 1993–94 and 1998–99. The WICB experimented with the format in these seasons – the 1995–96 saw a final match being played, while 1996–97 had a home-and-away round-robin format (so ten matches in total). The following season, the Red Stripe withdrew as a sponsor, and the tournament had to be renamed the President's Cup – and cut down to five matches a team once again. For 1998–99, the soft drink Busta came in as the tournament became the Busta Cup, and the tournament now got a semi-final and a final appended after the round-robin.

Barbados and Jamaica dominated the 2000s, as they have shared the first six titles of the millennium – Barbados becoming the first team to defend their title since Jamaica did it in 1989 and in total have shared fourteen out of the fifteen titles of the millennium (excluding the first-class knockout titles). The 2000s also saw attempts to include teams from other nations, as England A, Bangladesh A, India A and Kenya all competed (in chronological order, one team each season), along with a university side known as West Indies B. In 2002 Carib Brewery, became the title sponsor and the competition was known as the Carib Beer Cup for the next six years until Carib's sponsorship ended in 2008/09. The semi-finals were removed for the 2004–05 as was the West Indies B team and the tournament returned to a six-team league – this time with home and away matches, so a ten-game league with a final match between the top two teams. In the 2005–06 season, the league returned to one round-robin series so teams play five games before the top two play the Final. For 2008-09 season, it was known as the Headley-Weekes Trophy, named after George Headley and Everton Weekes. 

Since 2009 it has been known as the Regional Four Day Competition. Between 2008 and 2012, Jamaica won the competition for a record five times in a row. The only previous time a team had won the record five times in a row was between 1976 and 1980 when Barbados won the title; however, for that streak, the first title in 1976 was shared between Barbados and Trinidad & Tobago whereas for Jamaica's 2008-2012 streak the title was never shared with any other team.

In 2014, the WICB announced major structural changes to the first-class cricket competition starting with the exclusion of the Combined Campuses and Colleges team from the competition (in which it had participated since 2007-08). Additionally, it was announced that a franchise system was to be introduced for first-class cricket, similar to that of the Caribbean Premier League, with the six territorial teams being able to select players from all over the region and possibly from overseas. The new franchises would be owned by the territorial boards themselves and the teams would still retain their traditional territorial names. A draft system was also introduced, under which each of the territorial boards will be allowed to retain and contract 10 players, with the rest of the region's player pool going into a player draft for the teams to complete their 15-player squads. The regional four-day competition itself was extended to a double round-robin format and also became part of the WICB's new Professional Cricket League, which also included the NAGICO Super50. The newly extended Regional Four Day Competition will be played on a home and away basis over ten rounds from 14 November 2014 to 23 March 2015.

Structure 
From the 2010–11 season until the start of the Professional Cricket League the teams have played each other once in a double round-robin format followed by semi-finals which are contested between the top four teams of the league stage.

Points were awarded as follows:

 Outright win – 12
 Loser if 1st Innings lead obtained – 4
 Loser if tie on 1st Innings – 3
 Loser if 1st Innings also lost – 0
 Tie – 8

Incomplete Match

 1st Innings lead – 6
 1st Innings loss – 3
 Tie on 1st innings – 4

Score Equal in a Drawn Match

 Team batting on the 4th innings – 8
 Team fielding on the 4th innings if that team has lead on 1st inning – 6
 If scores tied on 1st innings – 4
 If team has lost on 1st innings – 3

Abandoned Match

In the event of a match being abandoned without any play having taken place, or in the event of there being no 1st innings decision, three points each.

Professional Cricket League era 

Since the 2014–15 season when Professional Cricket League started the teams have played each other twice in a round-robin with the team having the most points at the end of the League being awarded the Championship and the Headley/Weekes Trophy.

Points are now awarded similarly to the 2010/11-2014/15 era except that now the concept for points for first innings lead has been abandoned and replaced with bonus points for batting (1 point being awarded in intervals of 50 runs for total scores over 200 for the first 110 overs and up to a maximum of 5 points), bowling (1 point being awarded in intervals of 2 wickets for 3 wickets or more taken in a team's innings for the first 110 overs and up to a maximum of 3 points) and for pace bowling (0.2 points for each wicket taken by designated pace bowlers). Tied matches are now awarded 6 points instead of 8 points and the range of points awarded for drawn matches has been replaced by each team getting 3 points plus the bonus points. For abandoned matches, the points awarded to each team has been reduced from 3 to 1, except where a match is abandoned due to a dangerous pitch, in which case the visiting team are awarded 12 points (as would happen with an outright win).

Winners 

The above winners are of the league phase, since 2000/01 there has been a knock-out tournament (the Busta International Shield in 2000/01; the Busta International Shield/International Trophy in 2001/02; the Carib Beer International Trophy from 2002/03 to 2004/05; the Carib Beer International Challenge from 2005/06 to 2006/07 and the Carib Beer Challenge in 2007/08) with qualification based on league position. In 2000/01 four teams progressed to the knockout phase with Jamaica beating the league winner, Barbados in the first semi-final before going on to win the final against Guyana by first innings points in a drawn match. This form was reversed in the 2001/02 knockout competition when Guyana beat Jamaica in the final on first innings points in a drawn match. For the next three seasons (2002/03, 2003/04 and 2004/05) the league winners were also the winners of the knockout competitions, with Barbados beating Jamaica in the final by 7 wickets in 2002/03; Barbados beating Jamaica again in 2003/04 (by 84 runs) and Jamaica beating the Leeward Islands by 8 wickets in 2004/05. In 2004/05 however, only the top two teams from the league stage progressed to the knock-out competition. In 2005/06 four teams again progressed to the knock-out phase, where initial league winners Trinidad and Tobago won the final against Barbados. In 2006/07 only the top two teams qualified, Barbados (as league champions) and Trinidad and Tobago (as league runners-up). The league form was reversed as Trinidad and Tobago defended their title with a 49 run win. Trinidad and Tobago reached their third successive final in 2007/08, this time losing to Jamaica. In 2008/09 the knock-out Carib Beer Challenge was discontinued. In 2013/14 a knock-out tournament was reintroduced, with the top four teams from the league competition qualifying. Barbados' league form was reversed as Jamaica won the knock-out competition (and the Headley/Weekes trophy) against the Windward Islands in the final.

Number of wins by team (since 1965–66)

References

External links 
 A brief history of West Indies domestic cricket
 CricketArchive
 CaribbeanCricket
 Competition Format of 2005–06 Carib Beer Series (pdf-file)

 
West Indian domestic cricket competitions
Sports leagues established in 1965
Professional cricket leagues
First-class cricket competitions